Paul Kibikai (born April 4, 1991) is a Gabonese judoka. He competed at the 2016 Summer Olympics in the men's 81 kg event, in which he was eliminated by Takanori Nagase in the third round.

References

External links
 

1991 births
Living people
Gabonese male judoka
Judoka at the 2016 Summer Olympics
Olympic judoka of Gabon
21st-century Gabonese people
African Games medalists in judo
Competitors at the 2015 African Games
African Games silver medalists for Gabon